Gowd Sar (also known as Gowdī Sar) is a village in Barez Rural District, Manj District, Lordegan County, Chaharmahal and Bakhtiari Province, Iran. At the 2006 census, its population was 608, in 108 families.

References 

Populated places in Lordegan County